The 1914 Oklahoma A&M Aggies football team represented Oklahoma A&M College as an independent in the 1914 college football season. This was the 14th year of football at A&M and the sixth under Paul J. Davis. The Aggies played their home games at Lewis Field in Stillwater, Oklahoma. They finished the season 6–2–1.

Schedule

References

Oklahoma AandM
Oklahoma State Cowboys football seasons
Oklahoma AandM Aggies football